Waynesburg is an unincorporated community in Auburn Township, Crawford County, Ohio, United States.

History
Waynesburg was platted in 1833. It was named for General Anthony Wayne.

Geography
It is located at

References

Populated places in Crawford County, Ohio